My Morning Laughter is a 2019 Serbian feature film written and directed by Marko Đorđević, which was his directing debut.

The film premiered as part of the 2019 Belgrade Festival of Auteur Film where it won the Grand Prix award. It also won the Main Prize at the 2020 Motovun Film Festival.

References

External links
 

2019 films
2019 directorial debut films
Films shot in Serbia
Films set in Serbia
Serbian drama films
Serbian independent films
2010s Serbian-language films